Rolf Eriksen (1 September 1923 – 7 November 2007) was a Norwegian footballer. He played in one match for the Norway national football team in 1952.

References

External links
 
 

1923 births
2007 deaths
Norwegian footballers
Norway international footballers
Footballers from Bergen
Association football defenders
SK Brann players